Linds Crossing is a census-designated place (CDP) in Blair County, Pennsylvania, United States. Comprising the unincorporated communities of Linds Crossing and Upper Reese, it was first listed as a CDP prior to the 2020 census.

The CDP is east of the center of Blair County, at the center of Frankstown Township. The CDP is reached by Juniata Valley Road from U.S. Route 22 in Geeseytown; Juniata Valley Road continues east past Reese back to US 22 at Canoe Creek.

Demographics

References 

Census-designated places in Blair County, Pennsylvania
Census-designated places in Pennsylvania